The 1954 United States Senate election in Texas was held on November 2, 1954. Incumbent Democratic U.S. Senator Lyndon Baines Johnson was re-elected to a second term in office, easily dispatching his challengers.

Democratic primary

Candidates
Dudley Dougherty, State Representative from Beeville
Lyndon Baines Johnson, incumbent Senator since 1949

Results

General election

Results

See also 
 1954 United States Senate elections

References

Texas
1954
Senate
Lyndon B. Johnson